Alexander O. Smith is a professional Japanese to English translator and author. While his output covers many areas such as adaptation of Japanese novels, manga, song lyrics, anime scripts, and various academic works, he is best known for his software localizations of Japanese video games including Vagrant Story, Phoenix Wright: Ace Attorney, and Final Fantasy XII. He currently resides in Kamakura, Japan, where he operates his own contract localization business, Kajiya Productions, and is co-founder of a translation and publishing company, Bento Books.

Biography
Smith first gained an interest in Japanese after attending an exchange program in northern China. He obtained a Bachelor of Arts degree in Japanese from Dartmouth College/Keio University in 1995, and a Master of Arts degree in Classical Japanese Literature from Harvard University in 1998. Just before graduation, he interned at Sega, during which he was asked to perform voice-over for Winter Heat. His first work in translation was as a subtitler for Japanese television dramas. Smith joined Square after earning his master's degree, working as part of Richard Honeywood's nascent localization team. On his first project, Final Fantasy VIII, he and the other translators were not given access to the game files; they were instead forced to hack in their new dialogue using GameSharks during testing. In 1999, he worked as the main English translator for Yasumi Matsuno's Vagrant Story. Reviewers noted the high quality of the English script, in which Smith utilized various archaic English idioms and slang that distinguished the game from its straightforward Japanese counterpart. His last major work as a Square employee was on Final Fantasy X, for which he was awarded "Best Localization" of 2001 by RPGamer.

Smith left Square in 2002 to found Kajiya Productions—a freelance translation and localization company—with Joseph Reeder, his co-translator on Final Fantasy XII, though he would continue to collaborate on Square and Square Enix titles. By working as a contractor, he found that he had better access to the development team to aid in his translation process, free from the fetters of corporate communication protocols. In 2005, during the protracted development of Final Fantasy XII, Capcom hired Smith to work on the localization of Phoenix Wright: Ace Attorney. He found director Shu Takumi's writing to be very funny and clever, which drew him to the challenge of translating Takumi's jokes and wordplay. Smith joined the Final Fantasy XII project after Yasumi Matsuno, the original director, had left and was not able to collaborate on the script with him directly, unlike with Vagrant Story. Principal voice recording took place over eight weeks, with months of translation work both before and after that. Smith worked with Matsuno again on the 2011 PlayStation Portable remake of Tactics Ogre: Let Us Cling Together (titled Wheel of Fortune), which received a brand new translation. In 2011, Smith co-founded a book translation and publishing company called Bento Books with his friend Tony Gonzalez and his Kajiya Productions partner Joseph Reeder. The company's first major work was Math Girls, a mathematics-themed young adult novel by Hiroshi Yuki.

In addition to translation, Smith has composed English lyrics for a number of Nobuo Uematsu's vocal tracks, including "Melodies of Life" from Final Fantasy IX, "Otherworld" from Final Fantasy X, and "Eternity" from Blue Dragon. He also arranged lyrics for "The Skies Above" and "Otherworld" on The Skies Above, the second album from Uematsu's band, The Black Mages, and performed the spoken word intro to "Maybe I'm a Lion" as well.

Process
With his translations, Smith goes to great lengths to preserve the experience of the original text as much as possible, especially if it has a distinct feel. For The Devotion of Suspect X, he mirrored Higashino's "sparse, methodical tone of Japanese" by using more elevated and formal language. He draws on his academic background in classical Japanese literature to inform some of these translations. When it comes to the question of leaving Japan-specific terms untranslated, Smith is careful to either translate around it or provide a concise description of the term. He only resorts to leaving a word in Japanese in rare, plot-critical cases, such as with a  used as a murder weapon in The Devotion of Suspect X, stating "Nothing kills the flow of a text more than a long-winded explanation of something which would have come second nature to a reader of the original [Japanese]". For less "literary" mediums like manga and games, Smith feels more free to maximize the audience's enjoyment if a strict literal translation that adheres to the original sentence structure would impede that enjoyment.

Smith considers his treatment of Vagrant Story and Final Fantasy XII among his best translations. He looks to Vagrant Story as a title that demands to be in English and thought of his work as revealing the inner English game that always existed underneath. Smith was able to speak directly with Matsuno to improve the script translation, marking the first of their many collaborations. For Final Fantasy XII, his role entailed rebuilding the world to make sense for an English-speaking audience. He chose to portray the Archadian Imperials with a British accent to distinguish them from the American-accented Resistance members. For both of these titles, Smith relied on Matsuno's dense notes on the world's backstory to capture subtle and implied connections and preserve the rich texture of the game.

Smith compares translating lip synced dialogue to writing entirely in haiku. The 7% of Final Fantasy XIIs script that was voiced took more time to translate than the remaining 93%. In his role as voice producer, Smith searched for character actors like John DiMaggio and British stage actors for the judges. He was pleased by the performance of Johnny McKeown, the child actor who portrayed Larsa, a precocious prince. Smith was able to rewrite the script based on the actors he had cast for each character. He also made a key change to one of the final lines of Final Fantasy X with scenario writer Kazushige Nojima's approval. In the original Japanese, the main character's love interest, Yuna, tells the main character "" just before he fades away. Although the word literally means "thank you", Smith chose to elaborate on the connotations of the word and the tone of the scene, settling on "I love you"—the first time the phrase has appeared in a Final Fantasy game.

Works

Video games

Other works

See also
Localization of Square Enix video games
Richard Honeywood – Smith's superior at Square's localization department

References

External links 

 
 

21st-century American translators
American male voice actors
American video game designers
Dartmouth College alumni
Final Fantasy designers
Harvard University alumni
Japanese–English translators
Living people
People from Tokyo
American subtitlers
Video game localization
Year of birth missing (living people)